Freedom Riders were civil rights activists who rode interstate buses into the segregated Southern United States in 1961 and subsequent years to challenge the non-enforcement of the United States Supreme Court decisions Morgan v. Virginia (1946) and Boynton v. Virginia (1960), which ruled that segregated public buses were unconstitutional. The Southern states had ignored the rulings and the federal government did nothing to enforce them. The first Freedom Ride left Washington, D.C. on May 4, 1961, and was scheduled to arrive in New Orleans on May 17.

Boynton outlawed racial segregation in the restaurants and waiting rooms in terminals serving buses that crossed state lines. Five years prior to the Boynton ruling, the Interstate Commerce Commission (ICC) had issued a ruling in Sarah Keys v. Carolina Coach Company (1955) that had explicitly denounced the Plessy v. Ferguson (1896) doctrine of separate but equal in interstate bus travel. The ICC failed to enforce its ruling, and Jim Crow travel laws remained in force throughout the South.

The Freedom Riders challenged this status quo by riding interstate buses in the South in mixed racial groups to challenge local laws or customs that enforced segregation in seating. The Freedom Rides, and the violent reactions they provoked, bolstered the credibility of the American Civil Rights Movement. They called national attention to the disregard for the federal law and the local violence used to enforce segregation in the southern United States. Police arrested riders for trespassing, unlawful assembly, violating state and local Jim Crow laws, and other alleged offenses, but often they first let white mobs attack them without intervention.

The Congress of Racial Equality (CORE) sponsored most of the subsequent Freedom Rides, but some were also organized by the Student Nonviolent Coordinating Committee (SNCC). The Freedom Rides, beginning in 1960, followed dramatic sit-ins against segregated lunch counters conducted by students and youth throughout the South, and boycotts of retail establishments that maintained segregated facilities.

The Supreme Court's decision in Boynton supported the right of interstate travelers to disregard local segregation ordinances. Southern local and state police considered the actions of the Freedom Riders to be criminal and arrested them in some locations. In some localities, such as Birmingham, Alabama, the police cooperated with Ku Klux Klan chapters and other white people opposing the actions, and allowed mobs to attack the riders.

History

Prelude
The Freedom Riders were inspired by the 1947 Journey of Reconciliation, led by Bayard Rustin and George Houser and co-sponsored by the Fellowship of Reconciliation and the then-fledgling Congress of Racial Equality (CORE). Like the Freedom Rides of 1961, the Journey of Reconciliation was intended to test an earlier Supreme Court ruling that banned racial discrimination in interstate travel. Rustin, Igal Roodenko, Joe Felmet and Andrew Johnnson, were arrested and sentenced to serve on a chain gang in North Carolina for violating local Jim Crow laws regarding segregated seating on public transportation.

The first Freedom Ride began on May 4, 1961. Led by CORE Director James Farmer, 13 young riders (seven black, six white, including but not limited to John Lewis (21), Genevieve Hughes (28), Mae Frances Moultrie, Joseph Perkins, Charles Person (18), Ivor Moore, William E. Harbour (19), Joan Trumpauer Mullholland (19), and Ed Blankenheim), left Washington, DC, on Greyhound (from the Greyhound Terminal) and Trailways buses. Their plan was to ride through Virginia, the Carolinas, Georgia, Alabama, and Mississippi, ending in New Orleans, Louisiana, where a civil rights rally was planned. Many of the Riders were sponsored by CORE and SNCC with 75% of the Riders between 18 and 30 years old. A diverse group of volunteers came from 39 states, and were from different economic classes and racial backgrounds. Most were college students and received training in nonviolent tactics.

The Freedom Riders' tactics for their journey were to have at least one interracial pair sitting in adjoining seats, and at least one black rider sitting up front, where seats under segregation had been reserved for white customers by local custom throughout the South. The rest of the team would sit scattered throughout the rest of the bus. One rider would abide by the South's segregation rules in order to avoid arrest and to contact CORE and arrange bail for those who were arrested.

Only minor trouble was encountered in Virginia and North Carolina, but John Lewis was attacked in Rock Hill, South Carolina. Over 300 Riders were arrested in Charlotte, North Carolina; Winnsboro, South Carolina; and Jackson, Mississippi.

Mob violence in Anniston and Birmingham

The Birmingham, Alabama, Police Commissioner, Bull Connor, together with Police Sergeant Tom Cook (an avid Ku Klux Klan supporter), organized violence against the Freedom Riders with local Klan chapters. The pair made plans to bring the Ride to an end in Alabama. They assured Gary Thomas Rowe, an FBI informer and member of Eastview Klavern #13 (the most violent Klan group in Alabama), that the mob would have fifteen minutes to attack the Freedom Riders without any arrests being made. The plan was to allow an initial assault in Anniston with a final assault taking place in Birmingham.

Anniston

On Sunday, May 14, 1961, Mother's Day, in Anniston, Alabama, a mob of Klansmen, some still in church attire, attacked the first of the two Greyhound buses. The driver tried to leave the station, but he was blocked until KKK members slashed its tires. The mob forced the crippled bus to stop several miles outside town and then threw a firebomb into it. As the bus burned, the mob held the doors shut, intending to burn the riders to death. Sources disagree, but either an exploding fuel tank or an undercover state investigator who was brandishing a revolver caused the mob to retreat, and the riders escaped the bus. The mob beat the riders after they got out. Warning shots which were fired into the air by highway patrolmen were the only thing which prevented the riders from being lynched. The roadside site in Anniston and the downtown Greyhound station were preserved as part of the Freedom Riders National Monument in 2017.

Some injured riders were taken to Anniston Memorial Hospital. That night, the hospitalized Freedom Riders, most of whom had been refused care, were removed from the hospital at 2 AM, because the staff feared the mob outside the hospital. The local civil rights leader Rev. Fred Shuttlesworth organized several cars of black citizens to rescue the injured Freedom Riders in defiance of the white supremacists. The black people were under the leadership of Colonel Stone Johnson and were openly armed as they arrived at the hospital, protecting the Freedom Riders from the mob.

When the Trailways bus reached Anniston and pulled in at the terminal an hour after the Greyhound bus was burned, it was boarded by eight Klansmen. They beat the Freedom Riders and left them semi-conscious in the back of the bus.

Birmingham

When the bus arrived in Birmingham, it was attacked by a mob of KKK members aided and abetted by police under the orders of Commissioner Connor. As the riders exited the bus, they were beaten by the mob with baseball bats, iron pipes and bicycle chains. Among the attacking Klansmen was Gary Thomas Rowe, an FBI informant. White Freedom Riders were singled out for especially frenzied beatings; James Peck required more than 50 stitches to the wounds in his head. Peck was taken to Carraway Methodist Medical Center, which refused to treat him; he was later treated at Jefferson Hillman Hospital.

When reports of the bus burning and beatings reached US Attorney General Robert F. Kennedy, he urged restraint on the part of Freedom Riders and sent an assistant, John Seigenthaler, to Alabama to try to calm the situation.

Despite the violence suffered and the threat of more to come, the Freedom Riders intended to continue their journey. Kennedy had arranged an escort for the Riders in order to get them to Montgomery, Alabama, safely. However, radio reports told of a mob awaiting the riders at the bus terminal, as well as on the route to Montgomery. The Greyhound clerks told the Riders that their drivers were refusing to drive any Freedom Riders anywhere.

New Orleans
Recognizing that their efforts had already called national attention to the civil rights cause and wanting to get to the rally in New Orleans, the Riders decided to abandon the rest of the bus ride and fly directly to New Orleans from Birmingham. When they first boarded the plane, all passengers had to exit because of a bomb threat.

Upon arriving in New Orleans, local tensions prevented normal accommodations—after which Norman C. Francis, president of Xavier University of Louisiana (XULA), decided to house them on campus in secret at St Michael's Hall, a dormitory.

Nashville Student Movement continuation
Diane Nash, a Nashville college student who was a leader of the Nashville Student Movement and SNCC, believed that if Southern violence were allowed to halt the Freedom Rides the movement would be set back years. She pushed to find replacements to resume the rides. On May 17, a new set of riders, 10 students from Nashville who were active in the Nashville Student Movement, took a bus to Birmingham, where they were arrested by Bull Connor and jailed.

The students kept their spirits up in jail by singing freedom songs. Out of frustration, Connor drove them back up to the Tennessee line and dropped them off, saying, "I just couldn't stand their singing." They immediately returned to Birmingham.

Mob violence in Montgomery
In answer to SNCC's call, Freedom Riders from across the Eastern US joined John Lewis and Hank Thomas, the two young SNCC members of the original Ride, who had remained in Birmingham. On May 19, they attempted to resume the ride, but, terrified by the howling mob surrounding the bus depot, the drivers refused. Harassed and besieged by the mob, the riders waited all night for a bus.

Under intense public pressure from the Kennedy administration, Greyhound was forced to provide a driver. After direct intervention by Byron White of the Attorney General's office, Alabama Governor John Patterson reluctantly promised to protect the bus from KKK mobs and snipers on the road between Birmingham and Montgomery. On the morning of May 20, the Freedom Ride resumed, with the bus carrying the riders traveling toward Montgomery at 90 miles an hour, protected by a contingent of the Alabama State Highway Patrol.

The Highway Patrol abandoned the bus and riders at the Montgomery city limits. At the Montgomery Greyhound station on South Court Street, a white mob awaited. They beat the Freedom Riders with baseball bats and iron pipes. The local police allowed the beatings to go on uninterrupted. Again, white Freedom Riders were singled out for particularly brutal beatings. Reporters and news photographers were attacked first and their cameras destroyed, but one reporter took a photo later of Jim Zwerg in the hospital, showing how he was beaten and bruised. Seigenthaler, a Justice Department official, was beaten and left unconscious lying in the street. Ambulances refused to take the wounded to the hospital. Local black residents rescued them, and a number of the Freedom Riders were hospitalized.

On the following night, Sunday, May 21, more than 1500 people packed into Reverend Ralph Abernathy's First Baptist Church to honor the Freedom Riders. Among the speakers were Rev. Martin Luther King Jr., who had led the 1955–1956 Montgomery bus boycott, Rev. Fred Shuttlesworth, and James Farmer. Outside, a mob of more than 3,000 white people attacked the black attendees, with a handful of the United States Marshals Service protecting the church from assault and fire bombs. With city and state police making no effort to restore order, the civil rights leaders appealed to the President for protection. President Kennedy threatened to intervene with federal troops if the governor would not protect the people. Governor Patterson forestalled that by finally ordering the Alabama National Guard to disperse the mob, and the Guard reached the church in the early morning.

In a commemorative Op-Ed piece in 2011, Bernard Lafayette remembered the mob breaking windows of the church with rocks and setting off tear gas canisters. He recounted heroic action by King. After learning that black taxi drivers were arming and forming a group to rescue the people inside, he worried that more violence would result. He selected ten volunteers, who promised non-violence, to escort him through the white mob, which parted to let King and his escorts pass as they marched two by two. King went out to the black drivers and asked them to disperse, to prevent more violence. King and his escorts formally made their way back inside the church, unmolested. Lafayette also was interviewed by the BBC in 2011 and told about these events in an episode broadcast on the radio on August 31, 2011, in commemoration of the Freedom Rides. The Alabama National Guard finally arrived in the early morning to disperse the mob and safely escorted all the people from the church.

Into Mississippi

The next day, Monday, May 22, more Freedom Riders arrived in Montgomery to continue the rides through the South and replace the wounded riders still in the hospital. Behind the scenes, the Kennedy administration arranged a deal with the governors of Alabama and Mississippi, where the governors agreed that state police and the National Guard would protect the Riders from mob violence. In return, the federal government would not intervene to stop local police from arresting Freedom Riders for violating segregation ordinances when the buses arrived at the depots.

On Wednesday morning, May 24, Freedom Riders boarded buses for the journey to Jackson, Mississippi. Surrounded by Highway Patrol and the National Guard, the buses arrived in Jackson without incident, but the riders were immediately arrested when they tried to use the white-only facilities at the Tri-State Trailways depot.  The third bus arrived at the Jackson Greyhound station early on May 28, and its Freedom Riders were arrested.

In Montgomery, the next round of Freedom Riders, including the Yale University chaplain William Sloane Coffin, Gaylord Brewster Noyce, and southern ministers Shuttlesworth, Abernathy, Wyatt Tee Walker, and others were similarly arrested for violating local segregation ordinances.

This established a pattern followed by subsequent Freedom Rides, most of which traveled to Jackson, where the Riders were arrested and jailed. Their strategy became one of trying to fill the jails. Once the Jackson and Hinds County jails were filled to overflowing, the state transferred the Freedom Riders to the infamous Mississippi State Penitentiary (known as Parchman Farm). Abusive treatment there included placement of Riders in the Maximum Security Unit (Death Row), issuance of only underwear, no exercise, and no mail privileges. When the Freedom Riders refused to stop singing freedom songs, prison officials took away their mattresses, sheets, and toothbrushes. More Freedom Riders arrived from across the country, and at one time, more than 300 were held in Parchman Farm.

Riders arrested in Jackson included Stokley Carmichael (19), Catherine Burks (21), Gloria Bouknight (20), Luvahgn Brown (16), Margaret Leonard (19), Helen O'Neal (20), Hank Thomas (20), Carol Silver (22), Hezekiah Watkins (13), Peter Stoner (22), Byron Baer (31), and LeRoy Glenn Wright (19) in addition to many more 

While in Jackson, Freedom Riders received support from local grassroots civil rights organization Womanpower Unlimited, which raised money and collected toiletries, soap, candy and magazines for the imprisoned protesters. Upon Freedom Riders' release, Womanpower members would provide places for them to bathe while offering them clothes and food. Founded by Clarie Collins Harvey, the group was considered instrumental in the success of the Freedom Riders. Freedom Rider Joan Trumpauer Mulholland said the Womanpower members "were like angels supplying us with just little simple necessities."

Kennedy urges "cooling off period"
The Kennedys called for a "cooling off period" and condemned the Rides as unpatriotic because they embarrassed the nation on the world stage at the height of the Cold War. James Farmer, head of CORE, responded to Kennedy saying, "We have been cooling off for 350 years, and if we cooled off any more, we'd be in a deep freeze." The Soviet Union criticized the United States for its racism and the attacks on the Riders.

Nonetheless, international outrage about the widely covered events and racial violence created pressure on American political leaders. On May 29, 1961, Attorney General Kennedy sent a petition to the Interstate Commerce Commission (ICC) asking it to comply with the bus-desegregation ruling it had issued in November 1955, in Sarah Keys v. Carolina Coach Company. That ruling had explicitly repudiated the concept of "separate but equal" in the realm of interstate bus travel. Chaired by the South Carolina Democrat J. Monroe Johnson the ICC had failed to implement its own ruling.

Summer escalation

CORE, SNCC, and the SCLC rejected any "cooling off period". They formed a Freedom Riders Coordinating Committee to keep the Rides rolling through June, July, August, and September. During those months, more than 60 different Freedom Rides criss-crossed the South, most of them converging on Jackson, where every Rider was arrested, more than 300 in total. An unknown number were arrested in other Southern towns. It is estimated that almost 450 people participated in one or more Freedom Rides. About 75% were male, and the same percentage were under the age of 30, with about equal participation from black and white citizens.

During the summer of 1961, Freedom Riders also campaigned against other forms of racial discrimination. They sat together in segregated restaurants, lunch counters and hotels. This was especially effective when they targeted large companies, such as hotel chains. Fearing boycotts in the North, the hotels began to desegregate their businesses.

Tallahassee
In mid-June, a group of Freedom Riders had scheduled to end their ride in Tallahassee, Florida, with plans to fly home from the Tallahassee Municipal Airport. They were provided a police escort to the airport from the city's bus facilities. At the airport, they decided to eat at the Savarin restaurant that was marked "For Whites Only". The owners decided to close rather than serve the mixed group of Freedom Riders. Although the restaurant was privately owned, it was leased from the county government. Canceling their plane reservations, the Riders decided to wait until the restaurant re-opened so they could be served. They waited until 11:00 pm that night and returned the following day. During this time, hostile crowds gathered, threatening violence. On June 16, 1961, the Freedom Riders were arrested in Tallahassee for unlawful assembly. That arrest and subsequent trial became known as Dresner v. City of Tallahassee, named for Israel S. Dresner, a rabbi among the group arrested. The Riders were convicted of unlawful assembly by the Municipal Court of Tallahassee, and the convictions were affirmed in the Florida Circuit Court of the Second Judicial District. The convictions were appealed to the US Supreme Court in 1963, which refused to hear the case based on jurisdictional reasons. In 1964, the Tallahassee 10 protesters returned to the city to serve brief jail sentences.

Monroe, North Carolina, and Robert F. Williams
In early August, SNCC staff members James Forman and Paul Brooks, with the support of Ella Baker, began planning a Freedom Ride in solidarity with Robert F. Williams. Williams was an extremely militant and controversial NAACP chapter president for Monroe, North Carolina. After making the public statement that he would "meet violence with violence," (since the federal government would not protect his community from racial attacks) he had been suspended by the NAACP national board over the objections of Williams' local membership. Williams continued his work against segregation however, but now had massive opposition in both black and white communities. He was also facing repeated attempts on his life because of it. Some SNCC staff members sympathized with the idea of armed self-defense, although many on the ride to Monroe saw this as an opportunity to prove the superiority of Gandhian nonviolence over the use of force. Forman was among those who were still supportive of Williams.

The Freedom Riders in Monroe were brutally attacked by white supremacists with the approval of local police. On August 27, James Forman - SNCC's Executive Secretary - was struck unconscious with the butt of a rifle and taken to jail with numerous other demonstrators. Police and white supremacists roamed the town shooting at black civilians, who returned the gunfire. Robert F. Williams fortified the black neighborhood against attack and in the process briefly detained a white couple who had gotten lost there. The police accused Williams of kidnapping and called in the state militia and FBI to arrest him, in spite of the couple being quickly released. Certain he would be lynched, Williams fled and eventually found refuge in Cuba. Movement lawyers, eager to disengage from the situation, successfully urged the Freedom Riders not to practice the normal "jail-no bail" strategy in Monroe. Local officials, also apparently eager to de-escalate, found demonstrators guilty but immediately suspended their sentences. One Freedom Rider however, John Lowry, went on trial for the kidnapping case, along with several associates of Robert F. Williams, including Mae Mallory. Monroe legal defense committees were popular around the country, but ultimately Lowry and Mallory served prison sentences. In 1965, their convictions were vacated due to the exclusion of black citizens from the jury selection.

Jackson, Mississippi, and Pierson v. Ray
On September 13, 1961, a group of 15 Episcopal priests including 3 black priests entered the Jackson, Mississippi Trailways bus terminal. Upon entering the coffee shop, they were stopped by two policemen, who asked them to leave. After refusing to leave, all 15 were arrested and jailed for breach of peace, under a now-repealed section of the Mississippi code § 2087.5 that "makes guilty of a misdemeanor anyone who congregates with others in a public place under circumstances such that a breach of the peace may be occasioned thereby, and refuses to move on when ordered to do so by a police officer."

The group included 35-year-old Reverend Robert L Pierson. After the case against the priests was dismissed on May 21, 1962, they sought damages against the police under the Civil Rights Act of 1871.  Their claims were ultimately rejected in the United States Supreme Court case Pierson v. Ray (1967), which held that the police were protected by qualified immunity.

Resolution and legacy

By September it had been over three months since the filing of the petition by Robert Kennedy. CORE and SNCC leaders made tentative plans for a mass demonstration known as the "Washington Project". This would mobilize hundreds, perhaps thousands, of nonviolent demonstrators to the capital city to apply pressure on the ICC and the Kennedy administration. The idea was pre-empted when the ICC finally issued the necessary orders just before the end of the month. The new policies went into effect on November 1, 1961, six years after the ruling in Sarah Keys v. Carolina Coach Company. After the new ICC rule took effect, passengers were permitted to sit wherever they pleased on interstate buses and trains; "white" and "colored" signs were removed from the terminals; racially-segregated drinking fountains, toilets, and waiting rooms serving interstate customers were consolidated; and the lunch counters began serving all customers, regardless of race.

The widespread violence provoked by the Freedom Rides sent shock waves through American society. People were worried that the Rides were evoking widespread social disorder and racial divergence, an opinion supported and strengthened in many communities by the press. The press in white communities condemned the direct action approach that CORE was taking, while some of the national press negatively portrayed the Riders as provoking unrest.

At the same time, the Freedom Rides established great credibility with black and white people throughout the United States and inspired many to engage in direct action for civil rights. Perhaps most significantly, the actions of the Freedom Riders from the North, who faced danger on behalf of southern black citizens, impressed and inspired the many black people living in rural areas throughout the South. They formed the backbone of the wider civil rights movement, engaging in voter registration and other activities. Southern black activists generally organized around their churches, the center of their communities and a base of moral strength.

The Freedom Riders helped inspire participation in subsequent civil rights campaigns, including voter registration throughout the South, freedom schools, and the Black Power movement. At the time, most black Southerners had been unable to register to vote, due to state constitutions, laws and practices that had effectively disfranchised them since the turn of the 20th century. For instance, white administrators supervised reading comprehension and literacy tests that highly educated black people could not pass.

List of Freedom Rides

Precursors to Freedom Rides

Original and subsequent Freedom Rides

 Denotes location a Freedom Rider tested the compliance of the Boynton v. Virginia (1960) decision at a terminal facility only

Mississippi Freedom Rides

 Denotes location a Freedom Rider tested the compliance of the Boynton v. Virginia (1960) decision at a terminal facility only

Commemorations and monument

In celebration of the 50th anniversary of the Freedom Rides, Oprah Winfrey invited all living Freedom Riders to join her TV program to celebrate their legacy. The episode aired on May 4, 2011.

On May 6–16, 2011, 40 college students from across the United States embarked on a bus ride from Washington, D.C. to New Orleans, retracing the original route of the Freedom Riders. The 2011 Student Freedom Ride, which was sponsored by PBS and American Experience, commemorated the 50th anniversary of the original Freedom Rides. Students met with civil rights leaders along the way and traveled with original Freedom Riders such as Ernest "Rip" Patton, Joan Mulholland, Bob Singleton, Helen Singleton, Jim Zwerg, and Charles Person. On May 16, 2011, PBS aired a documentary called Freedom Riders.

On May 19–21, 2011, the Freedom Rides were commemorated in Montgomery, Alabama, at the new Freedom Ride Museum in the old Greyhound Bus terminal, where some of the violence had taken place in 1961. On May 22–26, 2011, the arrival of the Freedom Rides in Jackson, Mississippi was commemorated with a 50th Anniversary Reunion and Conference in the city. During commemorative events in February 2013 in Montgomery, Congressman John Lewis accepted the apologies of Chief Kevin Murphy of the Montgomery Police Department; Murphy gave Lewis his own badge, off his uniform, moving Lewis to tears.

In late 2011, Palestinian activists, inspired by the Freedom Riders, used the same methods in Israel by boarding a bus from which they were excluded.

In January, 2017, President Barack Obama declared the Anniston, Alabama bus station the Freedom Riders National Monument.

Cultural depictions
The 1980s PBS series, Eyes on the Prize, had an episode, "Ain't Scared of Your Jails: 1960-1961," which gave attention to the Freedom Riders. It included an interview with James Farmer.

The title of the 2007 film Freedom Writers is an explicit pun on the Freedom Riders, a fact made clear in the film itself which references the campaign.

PBS in 2012 broadcast Freedom Riders as part of its American Experience series. It included interviews and news footage from the Freedom Riders movement.

Dan Shore's 2013 opera Freedom Ride, set in New Orleans, celebrates the Freedom Riders.

The Boondocks aired a 2014 episode about the Freedom Rides with the title "Freedom Ride or Die".

The Freedom Riders: The Civil Rights Musical is a theater musical retelling the story of the Freedom Rides. The musical was created by Los Angeles screenwriter/director Richard Allen, and San Diego native music artist Taran Gray. Richard and Taran finalized the music in March 2016, and by April of the same year were asked to perform excerpts from their musical as a BETA Event at the New York Musical Festival (NYMF). The FREEDOM RIDERS musical received NYMF's inaugural BETA Event Award, and is scheduled to return to New York, summer of 2017, for an Off-Broadway run as part of NYMF's festival.

Notable Freedom Riders

Zev Aelony
James Bevel
Albert Bigelow
Malcolm Boyd
Amos C. Brown
Gordon Carey
Stokely Carmichael
William Sloane Coffin
Israel S. Dresner
James Farmer
Bob Filner
James Forman
Tom Hayden
Mary Hamilton
William E. Harbour
Genevieve Hughes
Bernard Lafayette
James Lawson
Frederick Leonard
John Lewis
Robert Martinson
Salynn McCollum
Charles McDew
Winonah Myers
Diane Nash
Wally Nelson
James Peck
Charles Person
Robert Laughlin Pierson
John Curtis Raines
Cordell Reagon
Meryle Joy Reagon
Charles Grier Sellers
Charles Sherrod
Fred Shuttlesworth
Carol Ruth Silver
Helen Singleton
George Bundy Smith
Ruby Doris Smith-Robinson
Peter Sterling
Daniel N. Stern
Hank Thomas
Joan Trumpauer Mulholland
C. T. Vivian
Wyatt Tee Walker
James Zwerg
Janet Braun-Reinitz

See also
"He Was My Brother", a 1964 Simon & Garfunkel song about the Freedom Riders
Breach of Peace, 2008 book
Redlining
Reverse freedom rides
Freedom Ride (Australia)

Notes

References

Bibliography

Further reading

Scholarly works

Autobiographies and memoirs

Other works

External links

"Freedom Rides: Recollections by David Fankhauser"
Freedom Rides of 1961 ~ Civil Rights Movement Archive
Get On the Bus: The Freedom Riders of 1961, National Public Radio
NEVER-SEEN: MLK & the Freedom Rides  - slideshow by Life magazine
You Don't Have to Ride Jim Crow! New Hampshire Public Television/American Public Television documentary of the Journey of Reconciliation
Eyes on the Prize, Blackside, Inc./PBS documentary of the Civil Rights Movement (Episode 3 is the Freedom Rides)
"JFK, Freedom Riders, and the Civil Rights Movement" EDSITEment lesson plan
"The Freedom Riders and the Popular Music of the Civil Rights" EDSITEment lesson plan
Civil Rights Era Mug Shots, Montgomery County Sheriff's Office, Alabama Department of Archives & History

Interview with Jim Zwerg, Civil Rights Activist, United States. People's Century television series. PBS and BBC
The Freedom Riders  - slideshow by Life magazine
FBI files on the Freedom Riders
Freedom Rider Articles. Online collection of Ride-related articles written by Freedom Riders~ Civil Rights Movement Archive.
Curated links to Freedom Riders archival material, Civil Rights Digital Library.
Civil Rights Activist Bob Zellner interviewed on Conversations from Penn State
Freedom Riders historical marker in Villa Rica, Georgia
CORE's Route 40 Project campaign for desegregation of Maryland highway, 1961
Freedom Riders interviews by American Experience at the American Archive of Public Broadcasting

 
1961 in American politics
1961 protests
African-American history of Alabama
African-American history of Mississippi
African-American history of South Carolina
Bus transportation in the United States
Civil rights movement
Civil rights protests in the United States
Conflicts in 1961
History of African-American civil rights
History of the Southern United States
Nashville Student Movement